Viktor Pavlovich Makhorin (July 2, 1948 – June 20, 1993) was Soviet/Russian handball player who competed in the 1980 Summer Olympics. He was born in Toshkent, Toshkent Shahri, Uzbekistan. In 1980 he won the silver medal with the Soviet team. He played all six matches and scored seven goals.

External links
Viktor Makhorin's profile at databaseOlympics
Biography of Viktor Makhorin 

1948 births
1993 deaths
Soviet male handball players
Russian male handball players
Handball players at the 1980 Summer Olympics
Olympic handball players of the Soviet Union
Olympic silver medalists for the Soviet Union
Olympic medalists in handball
Medalists at the 1980 Summer Olympics